Rahul Dev Burman (27 June 1939 – 4 January 1994) was an Indian music director who is considered one of the most influential composers of India and probably the most successful Music Director of Indian Music Industry. From the 1960s to the 1990s, Burman composed musical scores for 331 films. Burman did major work with his wife, Asha Bhosle, and Kishore Kumar and scored many of the songs that made these singers famous. He also worked extensively and scored approximately 331 songs including some of the most memorable numbers in his career for his sister-in-law, Lata Mangeshkar. Nicknamed Pancham, he was the only son of the composer Sachin Dev Burman and Bengali singer-lyricist Meera Dev Burman.

He was mainly active in the Hindi film industry as a composer, and also provided vocals for a few compositions. He served as an influence to the next generation of Indian music directors, and his songs continue to be popular in India and overseas.

Biography

Early life 
Burman was born to the Hindi film composer and singer, Sachin Dev Burman, and his lyricist wife Meera Dev Burman (née Dasgupta), in Calcutta. Initially, he was nicknamed Tublu by his maternal grandmother, although he later became known by the nickname Pancham. According to some stories, he was nicknamed Pancham because, as a child, whenever he cried, it sounded in the fifth note (Pa), G scale, of music notation; in Hindustani Classical Music, Pancham is the name of the fifth scale degree: (IAST: Ṣaḍja, Ṛṣabha, Gandhāra, Madhyama, Pañcama, Dhaivata, Niṣāda). Another theory says that the baby was nicknamed Pancham because he could cry in five different notes. Yet another version is that when the veteran Indian actor Ashok Kumar saw a newborn Rahul uttering the syllable Pa repeatedly, he nicknamed the boy Pancham.

Burman received his early education in West Bengal from Tirthapati Institution in Kolkata. His father S. D. Burman was a noted music director in Hindi language films, the Mumbai-based Hindi film industry. When he was seventeen years old, R. D. Burman composed his first song, Aye meri topi palat ke aa, which his father used in the film Funtoosh (1956). The tune of the song Sar jo tera chakraaye was also composed by him as a child; his father included it in the soundtrack of Guru Dutt's Pyaasa (1957).

In Mumbai, Burman was trained by Ustad Ali Akbar Khan (sarod) and Samta Prasad (tabla). He also considered Salil Chowdhury his guru. He served as an assistant to his father and often played harmonica in his orchestras.

Some of the notable films in which Burman is credited as the music assistant include Chalti Ka Naam Gaadi (1958), Kaagaz Ke Phool (1959), Tere Ghar Ke Samne (1963), Bandini (1963), Ziddi (1964), Guide (1965) and Teen Devian (1965). Burman also played mouth organ for his father's hit composition "Hai Apna Dil To Aawara", which was featured in the film Solva Saal, and sung by Hemanta Mukhopadhyay.

In 1959, Burman signed up as a music director for the film Raaz, directed by Guru Dutt's assistant Niranjan. However, the film was never completed. The lyrics of this Guru Dutt and Waheeda Rehman-starrer film were written by Shailendra. Burman recorded two songs for the film before it was shelved. The first song was sung by Geeta Dutt and Asha Bhosle, and the second one had vocals by Shamshad Begum.

Burman's first released film as an independent music director was Chhote Nawab (1961). When the noted Hindi film comedian Mehmood decided to produce Chhote Nawab, he first approached Burman's father Sachin Dev Burman for the music. However, S. D. Burman declined the offer, advising he was unavailable. At this meeting, Mehmood noticed Rahul playing tabla, and signed him as the music director for Chhote Nawab. Burman later developed a close association with Mehmood, and made a cameo in Mehmood's Bhoot Bangla (1965).

Initial successes 
Burman's first hit film as a film music director was Teesri Manzil (1966). Burman gave credit to lyricist Majrooh Sultanpuri for recommending him to Nasir Hussain, the producer and writer of the film. Vijay Anand also said that he had arranged a music session for Burman before Nasir Hussain. Teesri Manzil had six songs, all of which were written by Majrooh Sultanpuri, and sung by Mohammed Rafi. Four of these were duets with Asha Bhosle, whom Burman later married. Nasir Hussain went on to sign Burman and lyricist Majrooh Sultanpuri for six of his films including Baharon Ke Sapne (1967), Pyar Ka Mausam (1969) and Yaadon Ki Baaraat (1973). Burman's score for Padosan (1968) was well received. Meanwhile, he continued to work as his father's assistant for films including Jewel Thief (1967) and Prem Pujari (1970).

Marriage 
Burman's first wife was Rita Patel, whom he had met in Darjeeling. Rita, a fan, had bet her friends that she would be able to get a film-date with Burman. The two married in 1966, and divorced in 1971. The song Musafir Hoon Yaaron ("I'm a Traveller") from Parichay (1972) was composed while he was at a hotel after the separation.

Burman married Asha Bhosle in 1980. Together, they recorded many hit songs and also staged many live performances. However, towards the end of his life, they did not live together. Burman had financial difficulties, particularly later in his life. His mother Meera died in 2007, thirteen years after his death. She had been suffering from Alzheimer's even before her son's death. Just before her death she had been moved to an old age home, and moved back to her son's residence after the issue became a controversy.

Rise to popularity 
In the 1970s, Burman became highly popular with the Kishore Kumar songs in Rajesh Khanna-starrer films. Kati Patang (1970), a musical hit, was the beginning of a series of the 1970s films directed by Shakti Samanta of Aradhana fame. Its songs "Yeh Shaam Mastani" and "Yeh Jo Mohabbat Hai", sung by Kishore Kumar, became instant hits. Apart from Kishore Kumar, Burman also composed several of the popular songs sung by Lata Mangeshkar, Mohammed Rafi and Asha Bhosle.

In 1970, Burman composed the music for Dev Anand's Hare Rama Hare Krishna (1971). The Asha Bhosle song "Dum Maro Dum" from this film proved to be a seminal rock number in Hindi film music. The filmmaker Dev Anand did not include the complete version of "Dum Maro Dum" in the film, because he was worried that the song would overshadow the film. In the same year, Burman composed the music for Amar Prem. The Lata Mangeshkar song "Raina Beeti Jaaye" from this soundtrack is regarded as a classical music gem in Hindi film music. Burman's other hits in 1971 included the romantic song "Raat kali ek khwab mein" from Buddha Mil Gaya and the Helen-starrer cabaret song "Piya Tu Ab To Aaja" from Caravan. He received his first Filmfare Award nomination for Caravan.

In 1972, Burman composed music for several films, including Seeta Aur Geeta, Rampur Ka Lakshman, Mere Jeevan Saathi, Bombay To Goa, Apna Desh and Parichay. His success continued with hits such as Yaadon Ki Baaraat (1973), Aap Ki Kasam (1974), Sholay (1975) and Aandhi (1975). He also composed a song for a small documentary film called Maa Ki Pukaar, in 1975. After his father S. D. Burman went into coma, Burman also completed the music of Mili (1975).

Mohammed Rafi received the National Film Award for Best Male Playback Singer for the song "Kya Hua Tera Wada" from Hum Kisise Kum Naheen  (1977), composed by Burman. He continued to compose several popular songs for films such as Kasme Vaade (1978), Ghar (1978), Gol Maal (1979) and Khubsoorat (1980). He received his first Filmfare Best Music Director Award for Sanam Teri Kasam (1981). In 1981, he also composed hit music for Rocky, Satte Pe Satta and Love Story.

Abhijeet was given his major break by Burman in Anand Aur Anand (1984). Although he made his debut a long time ago, Hariharan was first noticed in a duet with Kavita Krishnamurthy in Hai Mubarak Aaj ka Din from Boxer (1984), which was composed by Burman. In 1985, Mohammed Aziz made his debut with Shiva Ka Insaaf (1985) under Burman.

The trio Kishore Kumar-Rajesh Khanna-R.D.Burman have worked together in 32 films, and these films and songs continue to be popular till date. The trio were close friends. R.D.Burman composed for 40 films for Rajesh Khanna.

Later career 
During the late 1980s, he was overshadowed by Laxmikant-Pyarelal,Bappi Lahiri and other disco music composers. Many filmmakers stopped patronizing him, as films featuring his compositions flopped at the box office one after the other. Nasir Hussain, who had signed him up for every single one of his productions since Teesri Manzil (1966), did not sign him up for Qayamat Se Qayamat Tak (1988). Hussain defended Burman in the press, saying that the latter did not give weak music in Zamane Ko Dikhana Hai (1982) and Manzil Manzil (1984). He also said that the composer was going through a lean phase during the recording of Zabardast (1985). But after these three films flopped, Hussain stepped down as a director, and his son and successor Mansoor Khan switched to other composers. The filmmaker Subhash Ghai promised Burman Ram Lakhan (1989), but gave it instead to Laxmikant–Pyarelal.
In 1986, Burman composed songs for Ijaazat; the score is regarded as one of his best. However, the film belonged to the Parallel Cinema genre of (art films), so it did not stop the decline of Burman's commercial film career. All four songs in Ijaazat were sung by Asha Bhosle and written by Gulzar. Burman was greatly appreciated by the critics for setting the non-rhyming lyrics of the song "Mera Kuchh Saamaan" to music. While both Asha Bhosle (Best Female Playback) and Gulzar (Best Lyrics) received National Awards for the score, Burman received none.
Burman suffered from a heart attack in 1988, and underwent heart bypass surgery a year later at The Princess Grace Hospital in London. During this period, he composed many tunes, which were never released. He composed music for Vidhu Vinod Chopra's film Parinda in 1989. He composed one song called "Chhod Ke Na Jaana" which was sung by Asha Bhosle for the film Gang. But since the film took too long to release and due to his untimely death, director Mazhar Khan signed in the then little known Anu Malik for the music of the film. The film got released later in 2000, even after Mazhar Khan died.Thenmavin Kombath, a Malayalam film by Priyadarshan was the last film he signed, but he died before he could score for the film. The music of 1942: A Love Story (1994), which was released after his death, was highly successful. It posthumously won him the third and last of his Filmfare Awards. As per Lata Mangeshkar, he died too young and unhappy.

Durga Puja songs 
R. D. Burman was a prolific contributor to the Bengali tradition of composing songs for the Durga Puja festival, many of which he later adapted for Hindi films. This includes hit songs such as "Meri bheegi bheegi si" from the film Anamika, "Pyar diwaana hota hai" from Kati Patang and "Tere bina zindagi se koi" from Aandhi. Even there was a sequel to the song "Phire eso Anuradha" sung by himself. However, the sequel had Asha Bhosle's vocals too "Phire Elam Dure Giye". Both versions were superhits.

Style 
Burman has been credited with revolutionizing Hindi film music. He incorporated a wide range of influences from several genres in his scores though his primary inspiration was Bengali folk. Burman's career coincided with the rise of Rajesh Khanna-starrer youth love stories. He made electronic rock popular in these popular love stories. He often mixed disco and rock elements with Bengali folk music. He also used jazz elements, which had been introduced to him by the studio pianist Kersi Lord.

According to Douglas Wolk, Burman "wrapped sugary string swoops around as many ideas as he could squeeze in at once". Biswarup Sen describes his popular music as one featuring multicultural influences, and characterized by "frenetic pacing, youthful exuberance and upbeat rhythms".

Burman was influenced by Western, Latin, Oriental and Arabic music, and incorporated elements from these in his own music. He also experimented with different musical sounds produced from methods such as rubbing sandpaper and knocking bamboo sticks together. He blew into beer bottles to produce the opening beats of "Mehbooba, Mehbooba". Similarly, he used cups and saucers to create the tinkling sound for the song "Chura Liya Hai" from the film Yaadon Ki Baaraat (1973). For Satte Pe Satta (1982), he made the singer Annette Pinto gargle to produce a background sound. He also rubbed a comb on a rough surface to produce a whooshing sound in the song "Meri Samne Wali Khidki Main" from the film Padosan (1968)

On multiple occasions, Burman experimented with recording the same song with different singers. For Kudrat (1981), he recorded the light semi-classical version of the song "Hume tumse pyar kitna" in the voice of Kishore Kumar, while the classical version was recorded in the voice of Parveen Sultana.

Burman sometimes used Western dance music as a source of inspiration for his compositions. As was common in Hindi films, some of his songs featured the tunes of popular foreign songs. Often, the filmmakers forced him to copy these tunes for the soundtracks, resulting in allegations of plagiarism. For example, Ramesh Sippy insisted that the tune of the traditional Cyprus song "Say You Love Me" (arranged and sung by Demis Roussos) be used for "Mehbooba Mehbooba" (Sholay, 1975), and Nasir Hussain wanted to use ABBA's "Mamma Mia" for Mil gaya hum ko sathi. Other examples of Burman songs inspired by foreign songs including "Aao twist karein" from Bhoot Bangla (Chubby Checker's "Let's twist again"), "Tumse milke" (Leo Sayer's "When I Need You"), and "Zindagi milke bitaayenge" (Paul Anka's "The Longest Day") and "Jahan teri yeh nazar hai" (Persian artist Zia Atabi's "Heleh maali") and "Dilbar mere" (Alexandra's "Zigeunerjunge").

Band members

Burman often collaborated with the same film directors and worked with the same musicians.

Music Assistants
Manohari Singh
Basudev Chakraborty
Maruti Rao Keer
Sapan Chakraborty
Babloo Chakraborty
Deepan Chatterjee

String Instruments
Guitar: Bhanu Gupta, Ramesh Iyer, Dilip Naik, Sunil Kaushik, Bonny D'Costa, RK Das, Gorakh Sharma, Soumitra Chatterjee, Bhupinder Singh, Anibal Castro, Binoy Singh, Tushar Parte, Bipin Panchal
Lap Steel Guitar: Bhupinder Singh
Bass Guitar: Tony Vaz, Charanjit Singh, Ramesh Iyer, Raju Singh, Gorakh Sharma, Emil Isaac
Santoor: Shiv Kumar Sharma, Ulhas Bapat
Sarangi: Sultan Khan, Iqbal
Sarod: Zarine Daruwalla, Aashish Khan
Sitar: Kartik Kumar, Arvind Mayekar, J.V Acharya, Ashok Sharma, Rahul Chatterjee, Shujaat Khan
Tar Shehnai: Dakshina Mohan Tagore
Song Violin: Gajanan Karnad, Sapre, Prabhakar Jog, Harishchandra Narwekar, Rajendra Singh Sodha
Violin: Nanekar, Nandu Chavathe, Uttam Singh, Ernest Menezes, Jerry Fernandes, Dorado, Ganesh Sharma, Bablu Chakraborty, Narbade, Puranmohan Singh, Buddhadev Singh, Bahadur Singh, Kishore Singh Jawda, Ashok Jagtap, Surendra Singh, Neville Franco, Prakash Verma, Manoj Shailendra, Amrit Singh, Kenny, Subhash, Debaprasad Chakraborty, Stanley Gomes, Ashish Roy, Franco Vaz, Abhijit Majumdar
Viola: Terrence Fernandes
Cello: Basudev Chakraborty, Benito Gracias, Sanjay Chakraborty
Swarolin: Rajendra Sodha
Mandolin: Kishore Desai, Ravi Sundaram, Mustafa Sajjad, Pradipto Sengupta, Shailu Sundaram, Mahendra Bhavsar, Isaac David, Arvind Haldipur, Jayanti Gosher
Bulbul Tarang: Rashid Khan

Percussion Instruments
Tabla: Shashikant Kudalkar, Amrutrao Katkar, Deepak Naik, Indranath Mukherjee, Vijay Katkar, Janardan Abhyankar, Marutirao Keer, Rijram, Brajen Biswas, Devi Chakraborty, Pramod Sane, Ramakant Hapsekar, Sharafat, Pt. Samta Prasad, Iqbal Khan, Lala Gangavane
Dholak: Shashikant Kudalkar, UK Dubey, Iqbal Khan, Roshan Ali, Devichand Chauhan, Girish Vishwa, Abdul Karim, Sudarshan Adhikari, Sattar, Pramod Sane, Chandrakant Satnak, Lala Gangavane
Drums: Buji Lord, Franco Vaz, Leslie Godinho, Wency D'Souza, Trilok Gurtu, Aadesh Shrivastav, Ranjit Barot, Kersi Lord, Suresh Soni
Bongo: Cawas Lord, Marutirao Keer, Francis Vaz
Congo: Babla Shah, Nirmal Mukherjee, Marutirao Keer, Devichand Chauhan, Ashok Patki, Vijay Katkar
Tumba: Ravi Gurtu, Nitin Shankar, Manya Barve, Paparao Parsatwar, Devichand Chauhan, Anup Shankar, Vijay Katkar, Dewan Ganguly
Percussion: Devichand Chauhan, Amrutrao Katkar, Homi Mullan, Marutirao Keer, Franco Vaz, Manya Barwe, Vijay Indorkar, Devi Chakraborty, Anup Shankar, Chandrakant Satnak, Cawas Lord, Santosh, Sadik, Johar, Narendra Vakil, Abhijit Koli, Vijay Jadhav, Pradeep Lad
Khol: Sudarshan Adhikari
Bangla Dhol: Abani Das Gupta
Halgi/Dhol/Chenda: Ganpatrao Jadhav
Tabla Tarang/Jal Tarang: Janardan Abhyankar
Matka: Indra Atma, Paparao Parsatwar, Manya Barve
Mridangam: Jairaman, Rijram
Madal: Ranjit Gazmer (Kancha), Homi Mullan
Pakhawaj: Bhavani Shankar, Sameer Sen
Octapad: Nitin Shankar, Anup Shankar, Franco Vaz

Keyboard Instruments
Piano: Louis Banks, Mike Machado, Lucille Pacheco, Tony Pinto
Synthesizer: Louis Banks, Kersi Lord, Charanjit Singh, Ronnie Monsorate, Vipin Reshammiya, Jackie Vanjari, Deepak Walke, Chitty Pillai
Transicord: Charanjit Singh
Accordion: Kersi Lord, Suraj Sathe, Homi Mullan, Jackie Vanjari, Chitty Pillai
Harmonium: Babu Singh
Electric Organ: Ronnie Monsorate
Xylophone: Bahadur Singh
Vibraphone: Buji Lord

Wind Instruments
Bansuri: Hari Prasad Chaurasia, Ronu Majumdar, Sumant Raj
Concert Flute: Manohari Singh, Raj Sodha, Shyamraj
Mouth Organ: Bhanu Gupta, R. D. Burman
Saxophone: Manohari Singh, Shyamraj, Raj Sodha, Suresh Yadav, Umesh Chipkar, Rao Kyao
Trumpet: George Fernandes, Joseph Monsorate, Bosco Monsorate, Kishore Sodha, Chris Perry, Prem Sodha
Trombone: Blasco Monsorate, Ivan Muns, Anibal Castro
Bass Trombone: Bhur Singh
Tuba: Munna Khan
Flugelhorn: Joseph Monsorate
Clarinet: Mirajuddin, Hussain Darbar
Shehnaai: Sharad Kumar

Legacy 
Several Hindi films made after Burman's death contain his original songs or their remixed versions. Dil Vil Pyar Vyar (2002), which contains several re-arranged hit songs of Burman, was made as a tribute to him. Jhankaar Beats (2003), which catapulted the music director duo Vishal–Shekhar into the limelight, is also a tribute to him. In Khwahish (2003), Mallika Sherawat's character is a Burman fan; the film features repeated references to him. In 2010, Brahmanand Singh released a 113-minute documentary titled Pancham Unmixed: Mujhe Chalte Jaana Hai, which received critical acclaim. The music of Lootera (2013) is a tribute to Burman. Other films which credit R. D. Burman include Gang (2000) and Monsoon Wedding (2001), for Chura liya hai.

A number of Indian remix albums feature Burman's songs, which are also popular in the country's pubs and discos. Several of his compositions were re-mixed by the South Asian DJs in the United Kingdom and North America, and feature in popular albums such as Bally Sagoo's Bollywood Flashback. Kronos Quartet's You've Stolen My Heart (2005) contains Burman's compositions sung by his wife Asha Bhosle. In the 2012 film Khiladi 786, Himesh Reshammiya-composed song Balma is also a tribute to R.D. Burman.

In 1995, Filmfare Awards constituted the Filmfare RD Burman Award for New Music Talent in his memory. The award is given to upcoming music talent in Hindi cinema. In 2009, the Brihanmumbai Municipal Corporation named a public square in Santa Cruz after  Burman.

Burman inspired many later Hindi film music composers, such as Vishal–Shekhar. Jatin–Lalit are considered to have carried on Burman's legacy through the 1990s. Notable musical assistants to Burman include Manohari Singh and Sapan Chakraborty. His instrumentalists included Hari Prasad Chaurasia, Shiv Kumar Sharma, Louis Banks, Bhupinder Singh and Kersi Lord. He is also noted for his partnership with the lyricist Gulzar, who wrote the words for several of his finest compositions.

Pancham Unmixed, a winner of 2 National Awards, is a 113-minute biopic on Burman, directed by Brahmanand Singh. A postage stamp, bearing Burman's likeness was released by India Post to honour him on 3 May 2013.

In India, Pancham Magic from Pune and Euphony from Kolkata hosts shows most likely on 4th Jan and 27 June every year with musicians, artists or otherwise worked with Burman every year. Besides this many events are celebrated in various parts of India every now or then with new talents or people who worked with Burman.

 R. D. Burman: The Man The Music

Discography 

Out of Burman's 331 released film scores, 292 were in Hindi, 31 in Bengali, 3 in Telugu, 2 each in Tamil and Oriya, and 1 in Marathi. Burman also composed for 5 TV Serials in Hindi and Marathi.

Pancham's non-film music comprises a few albums, including Pantera (1987), a Latin Rock album produced by Pete Gavankar (father of Janina Gavankar). The album was an international collaboration, for which Burman partnered with Jose Flores in San Francisco. In 1987, Burman, Gulzar and Asha Bhosle worked on an album titled Dil Padosi Hai, which was released on 8 September 1987, Asha Bhosle's birthday. Burman and Asha Bhosle also recorded the song "Bow Down Mister" with Boy George. In addition, he scored a large number of non-film songs in Bengali, which are available in different albums, and from which many numbers were later adapted in Hindi films. Burman also did playback singing in eighteen films for which he himself composed the scores.

Awards and recognitions 

Burman laid the foundation for numerous Hindi film music directors to pave the path for the future of music in Hindi language cinema.

Filmfare Awards
Wins
 1983 – Best Music Director – Sanam Teri Kasam
 1984 – Best Music Director – Masoom
 1995 – Best Music Director – 1942: A Love Story -posthumously awarded

Nominations
 1972 – Best Music Director – Caravan
1973 – Best Music Director – Amar Prem
 1974 – Best Music Director – Yaadon Ki Baaraat
 1975 – Best Music Director – Aap Ki Kasam
 1976 – Best Music Director – Khel Khel Mein
 1976 – Best Music Director – Sholay
 1976 – Best Male Playback Singer – "Mehbooba Mehbooba" from Sholay
 1977 – Best Music Director – Mehbooba
 1978 – Best Music Director – Hum Kisise Kum Naheen
 1978 – Best Music Director – Kinara
 1979 – Best Music Director – Shalimar
 1981 – Best Music Director – Shaan
 1982 – Best Music Director – Love Story
 1984 – Best Music Director – Betaab
 1985 – Best Music Director – Jawaani
 1986 – Best Music Director – Saagar

 Google Doodle

 On the anniversary of his 77th birthday on 27 June 2016, Google had a Doodle of R.D Burman on its Indian Home Page.

References

Further reading

External links 

 
 Pancham - Rahul Dev Burman

1939 births
1994 deaths
Singers from Kolkata
Bengali singers
Bengali musicians
Filmfare Awards winners
Indian male playback singers
Musicians from Mumbai
Performers of Hindu music
Hindi film score composers
20th-century Indian singers
20th-century Indian composers
Indian male film score composers
20th-century Indian male singers